Kwabena Darko (born 23 October 1942) is an entrepreneur, minister of religion and former politician. He owns the largest privately owned agro-industrial concern in Ghana and is listed in “Who’s Who in World Poultry”. Darko is also known by many in the sub-region as the “Poultry King” and "Akokɔ Darko" (meaning "Poultry Darko" in Akan).

Early life
Kwabena Darko was born on 23 October 1942 at Bekwai, in the Ashanti Region of Ghana. He lost his father at an early age and had to engage in petty trading to supplement the family income. He ended up in part-time education in order to devote more time to trading because of the family financial circumstances. His mother later remarried the owner of a small chicken farm. Kwabena Darko quickly learnt the running of the farm and was an able assistant to his stepfather. He proceeded to Israel, where he studied agriculture at the Ruppin Institute, specialising in poultry science in the late 1950s and early sixties.

Career
On his return to Ghana, Kwabena Darko worked with the  Ghana State Farms Corporation. After 6 months, he resigned and joined his stepfather, who was now into commercial poultry farming. The farm expanded from 5,000 birds to 100,000 birds for egg laying within two years. He started his own poultry farm, Darko Farms and Company in April 1967.

Politics
Kwabena Darko who describes himself as Nkrumahist run for president in the 1992 election on the ticket of the National Independence Party with Naa Afarley Sackeyfio as the running mate. He came 4th with 2.8 per cent of the total votes cast. The election was won by Jerry Rawlings of the National Democratic Congress, who reportedly said that "people should not buy chicken from Darko Farms, because if they did I would get money for politics".

Christianity
Darko was reportedly a Christian from the age of about 16 years. Between 1965 and 1996, he was a deacon (Elder) with the  Assemblies of God Church. He went on to hold other positions in the church. He has been the International Vice-President of the Full Gospel Business Men's Fellowship International (FGBMFI), (Africa), an international Christian network, from 1990 to 1995. He became the General Overseer for the Oasis of Love International Church since 1996. he was ordained as a minister of religion in 2000.

Family
Kwabena Darko is married to Rev. Dr. Christiana Darko, a director of the Darko Farms and Company Limited as well as the International Outreach Director for West Africa of The Women’s Aglow Fellowship International. They have six children, Sam, Vernon, Jonathan, Maxine, Mercy and Bernice. The first three are actively involved in running the company.

Positions currently held
Chairman and Chief Executive Officer, Darko Farms and Company Limited - 1969–present
Chancellor, Regent University College of Science and Technology - 2003–present
Member, Nominating Committee of the African Prize for Leadership 1994–Present
International Secretary, FGBMFI, Costa Mesa, U.S. 1994–Present
General Overseer, The Oasis of Love International Church - 1996–Present
Board Member, Oasis International Training Center - 2000–Present
External Board Member, The Bank of Ghana - 2001–Present
Chairman, Sinapi Aba Trust - 1994–Present

Honours
Grand Medal Order of the Volta, National Award for his Contributions to Agriculture - 1978
Honorary Certificate for Selfless Devotion to Charity by Christian Voluntary Society - 1978
Award by Ghana Animal Science Association for Outstanding Contribution to the Association - 1982
Best Farmer Award, Royal Agriculture Show, London - 1984
Honorary Member, Ghana Science Association - 1985
National Best Poultry Farmer - 1986
Meritorious Award for Contribution to Charity by the Ghana National Trust Fund - 1990
Certificate of Honor for Voluntary Service and Contribution to Charity by the Department of Social Welfare and Community Development - 1990
The First General Superintendent Certificate of Honor Assemblies of God Ghana - 1990
Certificate of Honor for Outstanding Contribution to the Ghana Feed Millers Association - 1992
Junior Achievement of Ghana Business Hall of Fame - 1992
Ordained as a Minister of religion - 2000
Honorary Doctorate of Science Degree by KNUST - 2002
Honorary Doctorate of Divinity by Global Missions and Bible College, London - 2002

See also
List of Ghanaian politicians
National Independence Party

References

External links
Profile of Kwabena Darko
Darko Farms and Company Limited

1942 births
Living people
Ghanaian Pentecostals
National Independence Party (Ghana) politicians
Recipients of the Order of the Volta
Candidates for President of Ghana
People from Ashanti Region
20th-century Ghanaian businesspeople
Ghanaian agriculturalists